Bangkokthonburi University (BTU) is a higher education institute located in Thawi Watthana District, Bangkok, Thailand. Founded in 2002, the college offers undergraduate and graduate studies in business administration, law, political science, science, education and medicine.

History 
BTU offers higher education for nearly 30 years ever since the establishment of Bangkok Vocational and Business College in 1987. Later, a series of new colleges were established, which were Bangkok Poly Techniques (1997), Bangkok Business Administration School (1999), Bangkokthonburi College (2002), and Bangkokthonburi University (2009). Bangkokthonburi University (BTU) was established as Bangkokthonburi College by Bangorn Benjathirkul on January 28, 2003.

BTU has contains four major functions, which are teaching and learning, conducting research, providing educational services to the public, and maintaining and preserving arts and cultural heritages. BTU is recognized as a leading institution of higher learning in Thailand.

Academic programs 
Using Thai as the language of instruction, Bangkok University awards bachelor's degrees, master's degrees, and doctoral degrees.

See also
 Faculty of Medicine, Bangkokthonburi University
 List of universities in Thailand

References

External links 
 

Universities and colleges in Bangkok
Educational institutions established in 2002
2002 establishments in Thailand
Universities in Thailand